The William Forst House, also known as the Clark House and the First-Clark House, is a historic house located in the Russellville Historic District of Russellville, Kentucky.  Built in 1820, it made history between November 18 and 20, 1861, as the site where the Confederate government of Kentucky was formed.  It has been listed on the National Register of Historic Places since July 19, 1973.

Description
The House is a two-story, five-bay, Federal style building made of brick.  It presently has ten interior rooms.  When first built, there were only five rooms and a  hall.  These were three  rooms and hall on the first floor, and on the second floor a  ballroom and another  room.  As there were still fears of attacks by Native Americans when the structure was built, there are no windows on the sides of the building.

The property has seen various changes over the years.  In 1890 the interior staircase was replaced.  The original kitchen, servants' quarters, and white-column front porch are no longer present.  A double-brick stairway takes the place of the porch.  In 1964, additions were made for the continued use of the Clark family.

History
The structure was built in 1820 by William First, an immigrant from England believed to be a cabinetmaker.  His surname was later altered to Forst.  He built the home to show his expertise in millwork and mantels.  In November 1861, the Confederate Sovereignty Committee met at the house.  Its 116 delegates from 65 Kentucky counties voted to secede from the Union, although the state capital at Frankfort chose to stay in the Union.  While meeting at the house, the delegates elected George W. Johnson to be the Confederate governor of Kentucky.

From 1922 to 1942 the house was used as a funeral home, under the ownership of Wister C. Clark.  His widow turned the ballroom into apartments in 1960, and the first floor was used as a law office by her son and his law partner.

Notes

References

 

Houses completed in 1820
Federal architecture in Kentucky
Kentucky in the American Civil War
National Register of Historic Places in Logan County, Kentucky
Houses in Logan County, Kentucky
Houses on the National Register of Historic Places in Kentucky
1820 establishments in Kentucky
Russellville, Kentucky
Individually listed contributing properties to historic districts on the National Register in Kentucky